The Master of the Iserlohn Altarpiece was a German painter, active in Westphalia during the first third of the fifteenth century.  His work shows traces of the influence of Robert Campin. His name is derived from an altarpiece in St. Mary's Church in Iserlohn.

15th-century German painters
Iserlohn Altarpiece, Master of the